The Bow City crater is a potential meteorite impact crater located in southern Alberta, Canada.

The  crater was discovered in 2012 by Wei Xie of the University of Alberta. The crater is estimated to have formed approximately 70 million years ago.
The crater is not directly visible from the surface, as it is buried under approximately a kilometre of overburden.  Petrochemical seismic studies provided the first clues to the existence of the crater.

References

Bibliography

External links 
 Aerial documentation of the Bow City impact crater

Impact craters of Alberta
Possible impact craters on Earth
Cretaceous impact craters
Geology of Alberta